The Braille pattern dots-5 is a 6-dot braille cell with the middle right dot raised, or an 8-dot braille cell with the upper-middle right dot raised. It is represented by the Unicode code point U+2810, and in Braille ASCII with a quote mark: ".

Unified Braille

In unified international braille, the braille pattern dots-5 is used as a formatting indicator, accent mark, or punctuation.

Table of unified braille values

Other braille

Plus dots 7 and 8

Related to Braille pattern dots-5 are Braille patterns 57, 58, and 578, which are used in 8-dot braille systems, such as Gardner-Salinas and Luxembourgish Braille.

Related 8-dot kantenji patterns

In the Japanese kantenji braille, the standard 8-dot Braille patterns 6, 16, 46, and 146 are the patterns related to Braille pattern dots-5, since the two additional dots of kantenji patterns 05, 57, and 057 are placed above the base 6-dot cell, instead of below, as in standard 8-dot braille.

Kantenji using braille patterns 6, 16, 46, or 146

This listing includes kantenji using Braille pattern dots-5 for all 6349 kanji found in JIS C 6226-1978.

  - N/A - used only as a selector

Selector

  -  を/貝 + selector 5  =  具
  -  な/亻 + を/貝 + selector 5  =  倶
  -  る/忄 + を/貝 + selector 5  =  惧
  -  む/車 + を/貝 + selector 5  =  颶
  -  も/門 + selector 5  =  句
  -  な/亻 + も/門 + selector 5  =  佝
  -  ぬ/力 + も/門 + selector 5  =  劬
  -  る/忄 + も/門 + selector 5  =  怐
  -  心 + も/門 + selector 5  =  枸
  -  火 + も/門 + selector 5  =  煦
  -  く/艹 + も/門 + selector 5  =  苟
  -  か/金 + も/門 + selector 5  =  鉤
  -  ふ/女 + selector 5  =  妹
  -  ゆ/彳 + selector 5  =  弔
  -  心 + selector 5  =  必
  -  え/訁 + 心 + selector 5  =  謐
  -  囗 + selector 5  =  戔
  -  て/扌 + selector 5  =  拘
  -  た/⽥ + selector 5  =  曲
  -  と/戸 + た/⽥ + selector 5  =  髷
  -  き/木 + selector 5  =  末
  -  て/扌 + き/木 + selector 5  =  抹
  -  に/氵 + き/木 + selector 5  =  沫
  -  の/禾 + き/木 + selector 5  =  秣
  -  心 + き/木 + selector 5  =  茉
  -  と/戸 + き/木 + selector 5  =  靺
  -  へ/⺩ + selector 5  =  片
  -  や/疒 + selector 5  =  疾
  -  ふ/女 + や/疒 + selector 5  =  嫉
  -  の/禾 + selector 5  =  秘
  -  の/禾 + の/禾 + selector 5  =  祕
  -  と/戸 + selector 5  =  考
  -  き/木 + と/戸 + selector 5  =  栲
  -  む/車 + selector 5  =  虱
  -  か/金 + selector 5  =  鈎
  -  そ/馬 + selector 5  =  駒
  -  け/犬 + selector 5  =  鼡
  -  け/犬 + け/犬 + selector 5  =  鼠
  -  う/宀/#3 + け/犬 + selector 5  =  竄
  -  と/戸 + け/犬 + selector 5  =  鬣
  -  selector 5 + そ/馬  =  且
  -  な/亻 + selector 5 + そ/馬  =  俎
  -  れ/口 + selector 5 + そ/馬  =  咀
  -  ふ/女 + selector 5 + そ/馬  =  姐
  -  や/疒 + selector 5 + そ/馬  =  岨
  -  ゆ/彳 + selector 5 + そ/馬  =  徂
  -  き/木 + selector 5 + そ/馬  =  柤
  -  に/氵 + selector 5 + そ/馬  =  沮
  -  め/目 + selector 5 + そ/馬  =  爼
  -  ま/石 + selector 5 + そ/馬  =  砠
  -  く/艹 + selector 5 + そ/馬  =  苴
  -  む/車 + selector 5 + そ/馬  =  蛆
  -  え/訁 + selector 5 + そ/馬  =  詛
  -  selector 5 + の/禾  =  之
  -  selector 5 + い/糹/#2  =  井
  -  た/⽥ + selector 5 + い/糹/#2  =  畊
  -  ほ/方 + selector 5 + い/糹/#2  =  舛
  -  き/木 + selector 5 + い/糹/#2  =  桝
  -  selector 5 + 日  =  亘
  -  き/木 + selector 5 + 日  =  桓
  -  selector 5 + ほ/方  =  亡
  -  ⺼ + selector 5 + ほ/方  =  肓
  -  心 + selector 5 + ほ/方  =  芒
  -  か/金 + selector 5 + ほ/方  =  鋩
  -  く/艹 + selector 5 + ほ/方  =  茫
  -  む/車 + selector 5 + ほ/方  =  虻
  -  る/忄 + selector 5 + ほ/方  =  惘
  -  に/氵 + selector 5 + ほ/方  =  瀛
  -  selector 5 + 宿  =  亢
  -  れ/口 + selector 5 + 宿  =  吭
  -  selector 5 + ゐ/幺  =  亥
  -  つ/土 + selector 5 + ゐ/幺  =  垓
  -  こ/子 + selector 5 + ゐ/幺  =  孩
  -  そ/馬 + selector 5 + ゐ/幺  =  駭
  -  selector 5 + る/忄  =  侖
  -  selector 5 + ゆ/彳  =  兪
  -  心 + selector 5 + ゆ/彳  =  楡
  -  へ/⺩ + selector 5 + ゆ/彳  =  瑜
  -  む/車 + selector 5 + ゆ/彳  =  蝓
  -  selector 5 + 囗  =  冂
  -  selector 5 + え/訁  =  叟
  -  ふ/女 + selector 5 + え/訁  =  嫂
  -  selector 5 + こ/子  =  呉
  -  く/艹 + selector 5 + こ/子  =  茣
  -  む/車 + selector 5 + こ/子  =  蜈
  -  selector 5 + け/犬  =  咢
  -  selector 5 + て/扌  =  夬
  -  selector 5 + な/亻  =  夾
  -  て/扌 + selector 5 + な/亻  =  挾
  -  ち/竹 + selector 5 + な/亻  =  筴
  -  selector 5 + ⺼  =  奐
  -  selector 5 + ひ/辶  =  巴
  -  ち/竹 + selector 5 + ひ/辶  =  笆
  -  selector 5 + さ/阝  =  巷
  -  selector 5 + り/分  =  帚
  -  く/艹 + selector 5 + り/分  =  菷
  -  selector 5 + う/宀/#3  =  彭
  -  selector 5 + ま/石  =  曼
  -  selector 5 + か/金  =  朱
  -  な/亻 + selector 5 + か/金  =  侏
  -  に/氵 + selector 5 + か/金  =  洙
  -  心 + selector 5 + か/金  =  茱
  -  む/車 + selector 5 + か/金  =  蛛
  -  え/訁 + selector 5 + か/金  =  誅
  -  か/金 + selector 5 + か/金  =  銖
  -  selector 5 + 仁/亻  =  爰
  -  selector 5 + む/車  =  牟
  -  き/木 + selector 5 + む/車  =  桙
  -  め/目 + selector 5 + む/車  =  眸
  -  selector 5 + し/巿  =  申
  -  つ/土 + selector 5 + し/巿  =  坤
  -  て/扌 + selector 5 + し/巿  =  抻
  -  selector 5 + み/耳  =  禹
  -  selector 5 + く/艹  =  禺
  -  く/艹 + selector 5 + く/艹  =  藕
  -  selector 5 + 龸  =  舜
  -  心 + selector 5 + 龸  =  蕣
  -  selector 5 + と/戸  =  豆
  -  よ/广 + selector 5 + と/戸  =  厨
  -  心 + selector 5 + と/戸  =  荳
  -  う/宀/#3 + selector 5 + と/戸  =  豌
  -  ひ/辶 + selector 5 + と/戸  =  逗
  -  selector 5 + や/疒  =  豈
  -  心 + selector 5 + や/疒  =  榿
  -  ま/石 + selector 5 + や/疒  =  磑
  -  selector 5 + ふ/女  =  賁
  -  selector 5 + に/氵  =  賈
  -  selector 5 + も/門  =  鬥
  -  selector 5 + め/目  =  黽
  -  selector 5 + selector 4 + ね/示  =  劔

Notes

Braille patterns